The Belarus women's national handball team is the national team of Belarus. It is governed by the Belarusian Handball Federation and takes part in international team handball competitions.

In light of the launching of the 2022 Russian invasion of Ukraine, the European Handball Federation in February 2022 temporarily suspended Belarus both in competitions for national teams and on the club level. The International Handball Federation banned Belarus athletes and officials. Referees, officials, and commission members from Belarus will not be called upon for future activities.

Results

World Championship
 1997 – 16th
 1999 – 14th

European Championship
 2000 – 11th
 2002 – 16th
 2004 – 16th
 2008 – 12th

Current squad
The squad chosen for two qualification matches against Wales for the 2017 World Women's Handball Championship.

Head Coach: Leanid Brazinski

References

External links

IHF profile

National team
Women's national handball teams
Handball